Liberty Township is an inactive township in Phelps County, in the U.S. state of Missouri.

Liberty Township was named for the American concept of liberty.

References

Townships in Missouri
Townships in Phelps County, Missouri